Corey James Miller (born October 25, 1968) is a retired American football linebacker in the National Football League for the New York Giants and Minnesota Vikings. He played college football at the University of South Carolina and was drafted in the sixth round of the 1991 NFL Draft.  

He has previously worked as host of The Corey Miller show from 3 to 6pm on Columbia sports radio station 560 the team. In November 2013, Miller joined the staff of Columbia, South Carolina Fox affiliate, WACH-TV.

Corey Miller's son Christian Miller is a free-agent linebacker in the NFL

See also
History of the New York Giants (1994-present)

References

External links
 Corey Miller statistics at Pro-Football-Reference.com
 Corey Miller statistics at Database-Football.com

1968 births
Living people
People from Pageland, South Carolina
American football linebackers
South Carolina Gamecocks football players
New York Giants players
Minnesota Vikings players